The Ceneri Base Tunnel (CBT) is a Swiss railway base tunnel in the canton of Ticino. It passes under Monte Ceneri between Camorino in the Magadino Flat and Vezia near Lugano; it bypasses the former high-altitude rail route through the Monte Ceneri Tunnel. It is part of the New Railway Link through the Alps (NRLA) project for faster north-south rail links across the Swiss Alps.

An exploration tunnel near Sigirino was excavated between 1999 and 2003 to gain geological data on the rock formations at the Ceneri Base Tunnel's level. Based on those data, it was decided to excavate most of the tunnel with traditional blasting methods and only drill a small part using a faster tunnel boring machine (TBM). Both the CBT and Gotthard Base Tunnels were built under contract from the Swiss Federal Government by Alptransit Gotthard AG. Construction of the two single-track bores started during March 2006. The official start of the CBT's construction phase was celebrated on 2 June 2006 with the laying of a foundation stone. The final breakthroughs took place on 21 January 2016 (west tube) and 26 January 2016 (east tube). Rail service started on 4 September 2020 and was operationalised for freight in December 2020.

On opening, the Ceneri Base Tunnel has become an important southern feeder for the Gotthard Base Tunnel as the existing, proportionally steep and curvy track over Monte Ceneri is not suitable for high speeds or heavy freight trains. Another feeder is the Luino link along Lake Maggiore which is about to be upgraded by Italy in prospect of the opening of the Gotthard Base Tunnel. Both links meet in the Magadino Flat in the future Camorino Node. The CBT will ease local train traffic, mainly between the two major cities Locarno and Lugano but also between Bellinzona and Lugano. Travel time on the TILO, an S-Bahn, from Locarno to Lugano dropped from 50 to 22 minutes.

History

Background

The Ceneri Base Tunnel is the lowest of the routes through the Ceneri axis and connects Camorino in the Magadino Flat to Vezia near Lugano. It allows traffic to bypass the conventional high-level railway running through the historic Monte Ceneri Tunnel. It forms only one element of a wider effort, commonly referred to as the New Rail Link through the Alps (NRLA) programme, which is being developed by AlpTransit Gotthard AG (ATG), a wholly owned subsidiary of the Swiss Federal Railways (SBB). When it became operational in December 2020, the Ceneri Base Tunnel began working together with the longer Gotthard Base Tunnel to significantly shorten the journey times between the Northern Swiss city of Zurich and the Northern Italian city of Milan by providing a flatter route for freight and passenger trains than previous conventional lines.

An operations center controlling ventilation and logistical activities has been constructed at Sigirino. Operationally, the Ceneri Base Tunnel is anticipated to be used by in excess of 300 trains each day travelling in both directions.

For handling emergency situations in the Ceneri Base Tunnel, the Swiss Federal Railways has acquired a fleet of dedicated rescue trains; these are equipped with specialised fire fighting equipment and other useful facilities, such as independent air supplies.

The Ceneri Base Tunnel was approved in July 2001 by the Swiss Federal Council, clearing the way for detailing planning activity to proceed. Further Parliamentary approval of the selected route for the tunnel was received in 2003, and the first funds towards construction were released during 2005. During April 2007, AlpTransit Gotthard AG awarded a Sfr85m ($91.52m) contract for the construction of the first underground element of the tunnel to Consorzio Monte Ceneri (CMC) JV, a consortium of CSC, Lugano, Frutiger, Thun, Rothpletz, Lienhard & Cie, and Aarau. During June 2009, the Board of Directors of AlpTransit Gotthard AG announced that it had awarded the principal contract for the tunnel's construction to the Consorzio Condotte Cossi consortium. At the time, the tunnel was expected to be operational by December 2020. This contract was valued at Sfr987 million ($1.6 billion). The estimated total cost for the Ceneri Base Tunnel is Sfr2.4 billion ($2.58 billion).

Construction

During June 2006, construction work on the tunnel officially commenced. During the spring of 2010, work commenced upon the boring of the Ceneri Base Tunnel itself. During March 2010, it was announced that blasting had begun on the main drives of the twin-bores. By the end of the year, the rate of tunneling had reportedly attained its full speed.

Breakthrough in the west tube between Sigirino and Vezia occurred on 17 March 2015. Breakthrough in the east tube between Sigirino and Vezia occurred on 30 March 2015. On 21 January 2016, breakthrough was achieved in the west bore between Sigirino and Vigana, while the breakthrough in the east bore between Sigirino and Vigana occurred on 26 January 2016. That same day, it was announced that the excavation process had been completed, and the installation of railway infrastructure was the next major stage of the work. During February 2017, the final concrete block was placed in a ceremony marking the tunnel becoming structurally complete.

During August 2013, the Mons Ceneris Consortium, headed by Mancini & Marti, was awarded a Sfr96 million ($103.36 million) contract to provide railway track and logistics for the tunnel. That same month, the Cablex-led CPC Consortium won a Sfr129 million ($138.89 million) contract to provide railway systems and overall tunnel co-ordination services. The planning, supply, installation and commissioning of the tunnel control systems, which are to be controlled from a control centre at Pollegio, has been contracted to Tunnel Control Systems. The awarding of these contracts was not without controversy; a pair of appeals were subsequently upheld by the Federal Supreme Court of Switzerland regarding the awarding process. At one point, it looked as if completion of the Ceneri Base Tunnel may be delayed as a consequence of legal disputes. However, the dispute was settled during September 2014, which unblocked the awarding of contracts as well as allowing for work to proceed.

During 2017 the installation of the track, electrical supply cables, telecommunications and radio systems, automation systems, overhead lines, and various safety and control systems commenced. During August 2017, the first sections of ballastless track were laid in the northern end of the eastern bore. On 30 May 2018, the final railroad tie was laid, meaning that trains can now travel the entire length of the tunnel.

The tunnel was officially opened on 4 September 2020. Final testing concluded with a rescue test in October 2020, and routine operations began in December 2020. The construction has cost CHF 2.5bn.

The monthly progress update graphic was available online.

See also
NRLA
Gotthard Base Tunnel
Lötschberg Base Tunnel
Zimmerberg Base Tunnel

References

External links

AlpTransit Gotthard AG - Official company site
AlpTransit Gotthard AG - Status of construction: Ceneri
AlpTransit Portal of the Swiss Federal Archives

Tunnels in Ticino
Railway tunnels in Switzerland
Tunnels in the Alps
Base tunnels
Gotthard railway
High-speed railway lines in Switzerland
Tunnels completed in 2020